Kalavari Kodalu ( Daughter-in-law of a Wealthy Family) is a 1964 Indian Telugu-language drama film, produced and directed by K. Hemambaradhara Rao under the Raghuram Pictures banner. It stars N. T. Rama Rao and Krishna Kumari, with music composed by T. Chalapathi Rao.

Plot
Dr. Anand and Shankar are best friends. Shankar is a famous Veena player and his sister Latha is a classical singer. Once Shankar leaves for a music competition and dies in an accident. Now Latha is alone, so Anand gives her shelter in his house where Latha gains everyone's affection and loves Anand. Afterward, she learns that Anand's marriage is already settled with his maternal uncle Sivanandam's daughter Rani and leaves the house. The train in which she is traveling has an accident when she loses her voice. Everyone thinks that she is dead but she is protected by a priest. Time passes, Anand becomes a famous ENT specialist and according to his mother Rajalakshmi's wish, he marries Rani. The priest takes Latha to Anand unknowingly, when he takes her along with him and succeeds in getting back her voice. The allied relation of Anand and Latha makes Rani jealous and leads to suspicion. So, she tries to poison Latha, but unintentionally ingests it herself. Before dying, she realizes her mistake and unites Anand and Latha.

Cast
N. T. Rama Rao as Dr. Anand
Krishna Kumari as Latha
Ramana Reddy as Sivanandam
Padmanabham as Bheema Rao
Chalam as Anji
Prabhakar Reddy as Shankar
Suryakantham as Gangamma
Geetanjali as Hamsa
Girija as Rani
Hemalatha as Rajyalakshmi

Soundtrack

Music composed by T. Chalapathi Rao. Music released by Audio Company.

References

Indian drama films
Films scored by T. Chalapathi Rao